Medicine Wheel is an album by bassist Ben Allison that was released by Palmetto in 1998.

Critical reception
All About Jazz called the album a "watershed moment in end of the century East Coast jazz."

Track listing
All compositions by Ben Allison.

 Spy
 Mousetrap
 Buzz
 Apostles of the Ugly
 Blabbermouth
 Spy (detail)
 Quirky Dungeon
 Tiny C

Personnel
 Ben Allison – bass, guitar
 Ron Horton – trumpet
 Michael Blake – saxophone
 Ted Nash – saxophone
 Frank Kimbrough – piano
 Tomas Ulrich – cello
 Jeff Ballard – drums

References

External links
 benallison.com - Medicine Wheel

1998 albums
Ben Allison albums
Palmetto Records albums